The 1939 New Mexico A&M Aggies football team was an American football team that represented New Mexico College of Agriculture and Mechanical Arts (now known as New Mexico State University) as a member of the Border Conference during the 1939 college football season.  In its eleventh and final year under head coach Jerry Hines, the team compiled a 3–6 record (1–4 against conference opponents), finished sixth in the conference, and was outscored by a total of 141 to 92. The team played its home games at Quesenberry Field in Las Cruces, New Mexico.

Schedule

References

New Mexico AandM
New Mexico State Aggies football seasons
New Mexico AandM Aggies football